Saccharin Study and Labeling Act of 1977 or Saccharin Study, Labeling and Advertising Act was a United States federal statute enacting requirements for a scientific observation regarding the impurities in, potential toxicity, and problematic carcinogenicity of a non-nutritive sweetener better known as saccharin. The Act of Congress invoked an immediate eighteen month moratorium prohibiting the Secretary of Health, Education, and Welfare from pursuing regulatory implications by limiting the production and use of saccharin. The Act codified a warning label requirement advocating the non-nutritive sweetener had been discovered to yield carcinogenicity in laboratory animals.

The S. 1750 legislation was passed by the 95th Congressional session and signed into law by the 39th President of the United States Jimmy Carter on November 23, 1977.

Research Perspective
In 1948 to 1949, U.S. Food and Drug Administration pathologists conducted laboratory analyses on Osborne-Mendel rat specimens concluding lymphosarcoma after a two-year laboratory analysis. In 1951, scientists collaboratively suggested the white crystalline sweetening agent could be a possible carcinogen. In 1958, saccharin was registered Generally Recognized As Safe (GRAS) by decree of the food additives amendment retaining the non-nutritive sweetener as a marketable product for human consumption.

In 1972 to 1973 after much growing concern among the United States population, the U.S. Food and Drug Administration and Wisconsin Alumni Research Foundation (WARF) led carcinogenic studies concluding the incidence of bladder tumors in Charles River Sprague-Dawley rat specimens. As a result of the laboratory analyses, the U.S. Food and Drug Administration revoked the Generally Recognized As Safe (GRAS) classification and imposed regulatory procedures restricting the use of saccharin in food products. In 1974, the National Academy of Sciences published a scientific review emphasizing saccharin could not be identified as the carcinogenic agent of benign tumors and malignant tumors due to equivocal analysis procedures, inadequate scientific experimental design, and potential impurities.

In 1977, the Canadian Health Protection Branch Study was completed on Charles River Sprague-Dawley rat specimens concluding lymphoma in the blood cells. The Canadian carcinogenic study encouraged Canada to remove saccharin as a marketable product for human consumption in 1977.

Provisions of the Act
The Act established criteria for the scientific study of saccharin with key elements regarding the display, notification, and labeling of the non-nutritive sweetener.

Saccharin and sweetening agent variants
'Saccharin' includes calcium saccharin, sodium saccharin, and ammonium saccharin.

Saccharin and conduct of study
(A) The Secretary of Health, Education, and Welfare shall arrange an analytical study to be conducted and based on available information of;
 Current technical capabilities are to be utilized to predict the direct or secondary carcinogenicity or other toxicity in humans of substances which are added to, become a part of, or naturally occur in, food and which have been found to cause cancer in animals.
 Direct and  indirect  health benefits  and  risks  to  individuals from foods which   contain carcinogenic or other toxic substances.
 Existing means of evaluating the risks to health from the carcinogenicity or other toxicity of such substances, the existing means of evaluating the health benefits of  foods  containing such substances, and the existing statutory authority for, and appropriateness of, weighing such risks against such benefits.
 Instances in which requirements to restrict or prohibit the use of such substances do not accord with the relationship between such risks and benefits.
 Relationship between existing Federal food regulatory policy and existing Federal regulatory policy applicable to carcinogenic and other toxic substances used as other than foods.
(B) The Secretary shall arrange a study to be conducted and to determine to the extent feasible of;
 Chemical identity of any impurities contained in commercially used saccharin.
 Toxicity or potential toxicity of any such impurities, including the carcinogenicity or potential carcinogenicity in humans.
 Health benefits, if any, to humans resulting from the use of non-nutritive sweeteners in general and saccharin in particular.

Entity to conduct study
National  Academy of Sciences is to conduct the studies whereby the actual expenses incurred by the Academy directly related to the non-nutritive sweeteners studies will be incurred by the Department of Health, Education, and Welfare. If the National Academy of Sciences declines the request to conduct any such study under such an arrangement, then the Secretary shall enter into a similar arrangement with another appropriate public or nonprofit private entity to conduct the non-nutritive sweeteners study.

Reports to congressional committees
Within twelve months of the date of the enactment of the Act a report is to be submitted to the Senate Committee on Human Resources and the House Committee on Interstate and Foreign Commerce;
 Results of the study conducted shall include supporting data and other materials provided by the entity which conducted the study.
 Any action proposed to be taken on the basis of the results of the study.

Within fifteen months of the date of the enactment of the Act a report is to be submitted to the Senate Committee on Human Resources and the House Committee on Interstate and Foreign Commerce;
 Results of the studies shall include supporting data and other materials provided by the entity which conducted the study
 Recommendations, if any, of such entity for legislative and administrative action
 Recommendations for legislative action as the Secretary deems necessary.

Labeling requirement
If product contains saccharin, a label or labeling shall bear the following statement:

 USE OF THIS PRODUCT MAY BE HAZARDOUS TO YOUR HEALTH. THIS PRODUCT CONTAINS SACCHARIN WHICH HAS BEEN DETERMINED TO CAUSE CANCER IN LABORATORY ANIMALS.

The statement is to be located in a conspicuous place on such label and labeling as proximate as possible to the name of such food and shall appear in conspicuous and legible type in contrast by typography, layout, and color with other printed matter on such label and labeling.

Labeling requirement for retail establishments, notice, and display
 If it contains saccharin and is offered for sale, but not for immediate consumption, at a retail establishment, unless such retail establishment displays prominently, where such food is held for sale shall bear the labeling statement.
 Each manufacturer of food which contains saccharin and which is offered for sale by retail establishments but not for immediate consumption shall bear the labeling statement.
 The Secretary may by regulation review and revise or remove the labeling requirement if a determination of such action is necessary to reflect the current state of knowledge concerning saccharin.
 The Secretary shall by regulation prescribe the form, text, and manner of display of the notice and such other matters as may be required for the implementation of the requirements. Regulations shall be promulgated after an oral hearing but without regard to the National Environmental Policy Act of 1969 and chapter 5 of title 5, United States Code. In any action brought for judicial review of any such regulation, the reviewing court may not postpone the effective date of such regulation.

Vending machines and health risk statement requirements
Regulation requires vending machines through which food containing saccharin is sold to bear a statement of the risks to health which may be presented by the use of saccharin. Regulation requires such statement to be located in a conspicuous place on such vending machine and as proximate as possible to the name of each food containing saccharin which is sold through such machine. Any food containing saccharin which is sold in a vending machine which does not meet the labeling requirement is to be considered a misbranded food.

Information availability and distribution
 Prepare information respecting the nature of the controversy surrounding the use of food containing saccharin.
 Provide for the distribution of such information for display by retail establishments where such food is sold but not for immediate consumption. The Secretary may review and revise such information if a determination of such action is necessary to reflect the current state of knowledge concerning the risks to health presented by the use of saccharin.

Amendments to 1977 Act
U.S. Congressional amendments to the Saccharin Study and Labeling Act of 1977.

Repeal of Saccharin Clause

The saccharin health risks clause, 21 U.S.C. § 343a, was repealed by the United States 106th Congressional session enactment of the Consolidated Appropriations Act of 2001. The 2001 Appropriations Act was confirmed as a federal law by the 42nd President of the United States Bill Clinton on December 21, 2000.

References

External links
  via GPO FDsys
  via GPO FDsys
 
 
 
 
 

1977 in law
95th United States Congress
United States federal health legislation
Health policy in the United States
1977 in the United States